Piwnice  is a village in the administrative district of Gmina Łysomice, within Toruń County, Kuyavian-Pomeranian Voivodeship, in north-central Poland. It is located in the Chełmno Land in the historic region of Pomerania.

The village has a population of 300. It is the site of Piwnice radio observatory.

References

Piwnice